Marion Ramsey (May 10, 1947 – January 7, 2021) was an American actress and singer. She was a regular on the series Cos but is best known for her role as the soft-spoken Officer Laverne Hooks in the Police Academy films. Later she appeared in the films Recipe for Disaster and Return to Babylon, and in the television films for SyFy, such as Lavalantula and 2 Lava 2 Lantula!.

Biography
Born in Philadelphia, Ramsey's entertainment career started on stage. She co-starred in Broadway shows, including productions of Eubie! and Grind, and toured the US in the musical Hello Dolly.
Her first television part was a guest role on the series The Jeffersons, and was a regular on Cos, the Bill Cosby sketch comedy series. In 1976, Her career in TV and film took off after she appeared as a guest on the hit sitcom The Jeffersons.

Ramsey was deeply committed to AIDS awareness and lent her voice for charitable causes, performing in "Divas Simply Singing," an annual fundraising event. Later in her career, she had guest appearances on Adult Swim shows Robot Chicken and Tim and Eric Awesome Show, Great Job!. In 2015, she reunited with Police Academy stars Steve Guttenberg and Michael Winslow in the Syfy camp film Lavalantula and its sequel 2 Lava 2 Lantula! the following year. Her final acting role was in the 2018 indie film When I Sing.

Ramsey had three brothers. She died at her Los Angeles home  on January 7, 2021, after a short illness.

Filmography

Work as a musician
Ramsey was a singer and songwriter who wrote songs with Haras Fyre (composer of "Supernatural Thing," "This Time I'll Be Sweeter," "Satan's Daughter" for Gary Glitter, and others).

References

External links

 

American film actresses
1947 births
2021 deaths
20th-century American actresses
21st-century American actresses
Actresses from Philadelphia
African-American actresses
American television actresses
20th-century African-American women
20th-century African-American people
21st-century African-American women
21st-century African-American people